The Serra de Crevillent is a mountain range in the Baetic System, southern Spain. It spans the region of Murcia and the province of Alicante. The highest peak is Sant Gaietà at 835 meters, near the town of Crevillent.

The Serra de Crevillent is located between the Vinalopó river and the Sierra de Abanilla. The latter is geologically its western prolongation, already within the Region of Murcia.

Events 
The archaeological remains found at Ratlla del Bubo site confirm the presence of Solutrean human settlements during the Upper Paleolithic.

During the 13th century, under the Al-Andalus rule, a network of qanats was created to supply water to the population of Crevillent. The most visible element of this infrastructure today is the Els Pontets aqueduct.

In the 19th century, it was the center of the raids of the bandit Jaume el Barbut.

See also
Mountains of the Valencian Community

Notes

External links
 Google Maps
 Red Natura 2000

References 

Crevillent
Baix Vinalopó
Crevillent